3rd Corps or Tây Nguyên Corps (literally: Corps of Tây Nguyên or Corps of the Western Highlands) is one of the four regular army corps of the Vietnam People's Army. First organised in 1975 during the Vietnam War, 3rd Corps had a major role in the Ho Chi Minh Campaign and the Cambodian–Vietnamese War. Today the corps is stationed in Pleiku, Gia Lai.

 Commander: Maj. Gen. Nguyễn Đức Hải
 Political Commissar: Maj. Gen. Chu Công Phu

History
In July 1973, the Central Committee of the Communist Party of Vietnam after its 21st conference issued a resolution of strengthening the armed forces to unify the country. In executing the issue, three months later the Ministry of Defence and the Military Commission of the Central Committee approved the plan of organising regular army corps for the Vietnam People's Army. On 26 March 1975, General Võ Nguyên Giáp, Minister of Defence, signed the edict that led to the establishment of the 3rd Corps in Tây Nguyên, from which came the name Tây Nguyên Corps of the unit.  The first headquarters of the corps consisted of party committee secretary (bí thư) Đặng Vũ Hiệp and commander (tư lệnh) Vũ Lăng.

During the Ho Chi Minh Campaign, it was 3rd Corps that advanced through the maritime regions of Phú Yên, Khánh Hòa Province and later captured Tan Son Nhat Airport. After the Vietnam War, 3rd Corps continued to engage in the Cambodian–Vietnamese War, the corps was awarded the title Hero of the People's Armed Forces (Anh hùng Lực lượng vũ trang nhân dân) in 1979.

Organisation

The command structure of 3rd Corps consists of the High Command (Bộ tư lệnh), the Staff of 3rd Corps (Bộ tham mưu), the Political Department (Cục chính trị), the Department of Logistics (Cục hậu cần) and the Department of Technique (Cục kỹ thuật). The combat forces of the corps include:

Commanders

Notes

References
 

Corps of the People's Army of Vietnam
Military units and formations established in 1975
Hero of the People's Armed Forces